The M45 Quadmount (nicknamed the "meat chopper" and "Krautmower" for its high rate of fire) was a weapon mounting consisting of four of the "HB", or "heavy barrel" .50 caliber M2 Browning machine guns (of the M2 Turret Type (TT) variant) mounted in pairs on each side of an open, electrically powered turret. It was developed by the W. L. Maxson Corporation to replace the earlier M33 twin mount (also from Maxson). Although designed as an anti-aircraft weapon, it was also used against ground targets. Introduced in 1943 during World War II, it remained in US service as late as the Vietnam War.

History
In order to develop a mobile anti-aircraft weapon, several 0.5 inch (12.7 mm) twin machine gun mounts were tested on the chassis of the M2 half-track including Bendix, Martin Aircraft Company, and Maxson. The Maxson M33 turret mount was preferred and—on the larger M3 half-track (T1E2)—was accepted for service in 1942 as the M13 Multiple Gun Motor Carriage. The mount was also used on the similar M5 half track as the M14 Multiple Gun Motor Carriage.

Experimentally, the Quadmount was also tested in 1942 on a M3 Light Tank in place of the tank's turret but the project was terminated.

Even as production of the two MGMC vehicles was underway, there was work to increase the firepower. Re-working the M33 to take four machine guns produced the M45 mounting.

The M45 Quadmount was the principal weapon (along with the 37mm gun) of highly mobile anti-aircraft artillery battalions deployed in the European Theater during World War II. These battalions provided invaluable air defense to much larger units, particularly field artillery. The M45 Quadmount units served as a very strong deterrent to strafing runs by enemy warplanes as, in addition to their gross firepower, its quartet of Browning M2HB "heavy barrel" .50 caliber guns were capable of being "tuned" to converge upon a single point at distances which could be reset while in use. Multiple-gun mounts were developed for the M2 Browning because the M2's rate of fire (450–550 rounds per minute) for a single gun was too low for anti-aircraft use.

The M45 found use throughout the war as a land-based weapon, particularly during the Battle of the Bulge. Although the Allies achieved air supremacy by the invasion of Normandy in June 1944, German attack runs were still a threat. German Jabo fighter-bombers could approach and attack at low altitude and then quickly retreat to avoid Allied fighters. The Luftwaffe also mustered a large number of planes for Operation Bodenplatte that took place on New Year's Day 1945. On March 7, 1945 when the U.S. Army discovered the Ludendorff Bridge intact across the Rhine, M45-armed U.S. half-tracks defended the American troops crossing the bridge on March 9, 1945 to great effect. At Oppenheim, when the Allies were gathering to make a massive push after crossing the river Rhine (March 1945), 248 German warplanes were used in an effort to destroy the bridge first. U.S. Army anti-aircraft artillery battalions massed, shot down 30% of the attacking force mainly with M45 Quadmounts and prevented the bridge from being touched before the U.S. Third Army went into Germany.

It was also tested by the US Navy as a solution for the Kamikaze attacks that started in late 1944. Two Essex class aircraft carriers received six mounts each for operational testing starting with CV-16 Lexington in May 1945. Her gunnery department in general was positive towards the powered mounts but felt that the guns were too light and ineffective against the high speeds that the diving Kamikaze aircraft possessed.

The M45 Quadmount was ineffective against the new, fast-flying planes of the Jet Age. However, it was used against infantry targets in US post-war service. In Vietnam they were pressed into service to defend bases and to ride escort convoys along Viet Cong roads.

The French Army also used M45s in combat. M45 Quad Mounts were placed in trucks to deal with ambushes and four M45s were used during the Battle of Dien Bien Phu.

TCM-20
The TCM-20 was a postwar Israeli development of the M45 mount, equipped with two 20mm Hispano-Suiza HS.404 cannons in lieu of machine guns. In frontline Israeli service, it was replaced by the M163 Vulcan Air Defense System in the 1970s, but some reserve units still used TCM-20s into the 1980s. The weapon was also exported to several third-world countries.

Mountings
During World War II, the M45 turret was mounted on two specific systems; the M16 Multiple Gun Motor Carriage and the M51 Multiple Machine Gun Carriage.  When mounted on the M20 trailer, it was known as the M55 Machine Gun Trailer Mount, but this system had not finished testing before the cessation of hostilities.  M51s were withdrawn from service by the end of World War II in favor of the M55.

During the Korean War, the M55 and M16 saw extensive combat, and lessons learned in Korea led to the conversion of an additional 1200 M3 halftracks into the M16A1 variant by adding an M45 turret.  These can be identified by the lack of fold-down armor and rear troop door on the crew compartment and were often fitted with the roller front bumper instead of the winch bumper fitted to all M16s.  In 1954 an additional modification was made to roughly 700 M16 MGMCs, adding the rear troop door and bolting the fold-down armor in the up position.  This modification became known as the M16A2 MGMC.

The M55 received a new, more powerful generator in the 1960s and served through the Vietnam War, usually mounted in the back of an M35 2.5 ton or M54 5-ton gun trucks.

Operation
The M45 is operated by two loaders and one gunner. The mount is capable of traversing a full 360 degrees around, with an angle elevation between -10 and +90 degrees. Traverse and elevation are electrically driven, powered by two rechargeable 6-volt batteries. All four guns could be fired at once, but standard practice was to alternate between firing the upper and lower pair of guns, allowing one pair to cool while the other was in use. This allowed for longer periods of action as overheating of the gun barrels was lessened.

The "tombstone" model M2 ammunition chests held 200 rounds each—with one ammunition chest on an M45 system holding ten times as many rounds as each of the four twenty-round 20mm magazines of the German Flakvierling system held (and which, on the German ordnance system, had to be changed every six seconds on each gun of the quartet to ensure its own top 800 rpm "combined" firing rate), with each M2 ammo chest weighing 89 pounds each when full.

Gallery

Operators

See also
 List of U.S. military vehicles by supply catalog designation
 DTM-4
 Flakvierling 38, quadruple 20 mm autocannon-based weapon system mountable onto a Sd.Kfz. 7/1 half-track, as just one example
Wirbelwind, quad-barrel 2 cm Flakvierling 38.
ZPU-4, quadruple 14.5mm heavy machine gun-based weapon system mountable onto technicals, cargo trucks, and APCs.

Notes

References
Training Manuals
 TM 9-2800 Military vehicles
 TM 9-2010
 TM 9-1223
 FM 44-57
M20 trailer
 SNL G220
 TM 9-789
M17 trailer
 SNL G221
 TM 9-881

External links
Scribd's Archived M45 Quadmount Manual 
M45 Quadmount
Part I: The "Quad 50" Machine Gun Mount 
Rt66.com

Anti-aircraft guns of the United States
Cold War firearms of the United States
Heavy machine guns
Machine guns of the United States
Salvo weapons
World War II anti-aircraft guns
World War II firearms of the United States
Weapons and ammunition introduced in 1943
United States Marine Corps equipment